The Philippines competed at the 1984 Summer Olympics in Los Angeles, United States.  The nation returned to the Summer Games after participating in the American-led boycott of the 1980 Summer Olympics. 19 competitors, 15 men and 4 women, took part in 28 events in 6 sports.

Athletics

Men's 400 metres 
 Isidro del Prado
 Heat — 46.82
 Quarterfinals — 46.71 (→ did not advance)
 
Men's Marathon
 Leonardo Illut
 Final — 2:49:39 (→ 77th place)

Men's 3.000m Steeplechase
 Hector Begeo

Women’s 100 metres
 Lydia de Vega
 
Women’s 200 metres
 Lydia de Vega
 
Women's 400m Hurdles 
 Agripina de la Cruz
 Heat — 1:02.70 (→ did not advance)

Women's Long Jump
 Elma Muros
 Qualification — 5.64 m (→ did not advance, 20th place)

Boxing

Men's Light Flyweight
 Nelson Jamili

Men's Flyweight
 Efren Tabanas

Men's Lightweight
 Leopoldo Cantancio

Cycling

Seven cyclists represented the Philippines in 1984.

Sprint
 Rodolfo Guaves
 Deogracias Asuncion

1000m time trial
 Rodolfo Guaves

Individual pursuit
 Diomedes Panton
 
Points race
 Edgardo Pagarigan
 Deogracias Asuncion

Sailing

Men's Windglider
 Policarpio Ortega

Shooting

Men's Small bore rifle, prone position
 José Medina

Swimming

Men's 100m Freestyle
 William Wilson
 Heat — 54.63 (→ did not advance, 45th place)

Men's 200m Freestyle
 William Wilson
 Heat — 1:57.18 (→ did not advance, 39th place)

Men's 400m Freestyle
William Wilson
 Heat — 4:06.86 (→ did not advance, 28th place)

Men's 1500m Freestyle
 William Wilson
 Heat — 16:24.81 (→ did not advance, 24th place)

Men's 100m Breaststroke
Francisco Guanco
 Heat — 1:07.55 (→ did not advance, 32nd place)

Jairulla Jaitulla
 Heat — 1:08.00 (→ did not advance, 36th place)

Men's 200m Breaststroke
Francisco Guanco
 Heat — 2:26.12 (→ did not advance, 25th place)

Jairulla Jaitulla
 Heat — 2:30.87 (→ did not advance, 35th place)

Men's 200m Individual Medley
Jairulla Jaitulla
 Heat — 2:12.82 (→ did not advance, 28th place)

Men's 400m Individual Medley
Jairulla Jaitulla
 Heat — 4:51.24 (→ did not advance, 18th place)

Women's 100m Freestyle
Christine Jacob
 Heat — 1:02.43 (→ did not advance, 36th place)
 
Women's 200m Freestyle
Christine Jacob
 Heat — 2:09.79 (→ did not advance, 25th place)
 
Women's 100m Backstroke
 Christine Jacob
 Heat — 1:10.28 (→ did not advance, 28th place)

Women's 200m Backstroke
 Christine Jacob
 Heat — 2:32.91 (→ did not advance, 27th place)

Demonstration sports

Tennis

Men's Singles Competition
 Manuel Tolentino

References

External links
Philippine Sports Commission
Official Olympic Reports

Nations at the 1984 Summer Olympics
1984
Summer Olympics